JKN Global Group Public Company Limited (formerly known as STGCP, JKN Living and JKN Global Media) is a Thai multinational conglomerate founded by Jakkaphong Jakrajutatip.  Its headquarters are in the JKN Empire building in Samut Prakan, Thailand. It comprises numerous businesses in various industries of beverages, content distribution, cosmetics, health products, home shopping, energy drinks, entertainment, events, film, mass media, personal care, television advertisement, and television program.

JKN Global Group owns the television networks – JKN18 and JKN-CNBC (in collaboration with Comcast's NBCUniversal), the notable beauty pageants – Miss Universe, Miss USA, and Miss Teen USA, and the home shopping JKN Hi Shopping (in collaboration with Hyundai Home Shopping Network).

Major shareholders
As of March 25, 2022

Subsidiary company

References

External links

 
2017 initial public offerings
2013 establishments in Thailand
Companies based in Samut Prakan Province
Companies listed on the Stock Exchange of Thailand
Conglomerate companies established in 2013
Conglomerate companies of Thailand
Multinational companies headquartered in Thailand